Fitzsimons Army Hospital, also known as Fitzsimons General Hospital and renamed Fitzsimons Army Medical Center (FAMC) in 1974, was a U.S. Army facility located on  in Aurora, Colorado. The facility opened in 1918 and closed in 1999. The grounds were then redeveloped for civilian use as the Anschutz Medical Campus and the Fitzsimons Innovation Community.

History
The facility was founded by the United States Army during World War I arising from the need to treat the large number of casualties from chemical weapons in Europe. Denver's reputation as a prime location for the treatment of tuberculosis led local citizens to lobby the Army on behalf of Denver as the site for the new hospital. Army Hospital 21, as it was first called, was formally dedicated in the autumn of 1918 in Aurora, which at the time had a population of less than 1,000. In July 1920, the facility was formally renamed the Fitzsimons Army Hospital after Lt. William T. Fitzsimons, the first American medical officer killed in World War I. A new main building, known as Building 500, was built in 1941. At the time, it was the largest structure in Colorado.

The facility was used heavily during World War II to treat returning casualties and became one of the Army's premier medical training centers. In the 1950s, Dwight Eisenhower received treatment at the facility three separate times for his heart condition while he was president. In September 1955, while on vacation at his in-laws' house in Denver, he suffered a myocardial infarction and was placed in an oxygen tent at the facility. In 2000, a suite of rooms on the hospital's eighth floor was restored to appear as it did when Eisenhower was recovering there.

In the 1960s, Fitzsimons Army Hospital became further known for its "Clinical Specialist School," at that time one of the longest professional schools for enlisted US military personnel. US Army medics of varied service and rank studied both academically and in rotation on the hospital's wards. At the end of close to a year of study, those students who had previously gained "Combat Medic" (91A10) and "Medical Specialist" (91B20) proficiency now graduated as "Clinical Specialists" (91C20), a level of medical proficiency which paralleled that of the "Licensed Practical Nurse" (LPN or LVN) in the civilian world, but inclusive of additional skills such as treatment of basic wound trauma and elemental surgical methods more applicable to military wartime nursing. Most of the 91C20s ("Ninety-one Charlies") would find themselves working with registered nurses in military hospital settings, but as the Vietnam War was at its height in the late 1960s, certain graduates would move on to Special Forces assignments and such as Medical Civic Action assistance (MEDCAPs) for those Vietnamese living in more remote regions, and so often forced to go without the benefits enjoyed by Vietnamese living near cities. "Ninety-one Charlies" proved well suited to a medical niche previously wanting for civilian-certified Practical Nurses.

Closure and transfer of facilities

In July 1995, the Base Realignment and Closure Commission recommended the closure of the facility, with the exception of the Edgar J. McWhethy Army Reserve Center, located at the southeast corner of the installation.  The closure was completed in 1999 and the reserve center was relocated to the northeast portion of the site. The projected $5 billion (Economic Contributions of Activities at Fitzsimons Life Science District and the UC Denver Anschutz Medical Campus - Sammons/Dutton LLC, 2008) redevelopment of the facility into civilian use currently includes the construction of the University of Colorado Hospital's $147 million Anschutz Inpatient Pavilion, and the $509-million Children's Hospital. The medical campus also includes University of Colorado Denver medical education and research facilities, including the Ben Nighthorse Campbell Center for Native American Research, named in honor of the U.S. Senator Ben Nighthorse Campbell of Colorado.

Additional facilities currently built at the former base include the Bioscience Park Center and Bioscience East (multi-tenant commercial lab buildings in the planned  Colorado Science+Technology Park at Fitzsimons) and 21 Fitzsimons(a residential/retail town center). The  Veterans Affairs Medical Center was opened in 2018.

United States Army Medical Equipment and Optical School (USAMEOS) 
FAMC was the location of the United States Army Medical Equipment and Optical School (USAMEOS). USAMEOS provided technicians trained in Biomedical Equipment Repair or Optical Laboratory Operations. Biomedical equipment repair personnel (referred to as BMETs—pronounced 'bee/mets') were assigned to military medical units to install, maintain, repair, and calibrate sophisticated life support, diagnostic, imaging, and general medical equipment. Military Occupation Specialties (MOS) graduating from USAMEOS included: 35G, 35S, 35T, and 35U. Optical laboratory technicians were designated as 42E upon graduation of the 21-week optical training course. In the hallways of the USAMEOS training facility hung the pictures of graduating BMET classes over decades of operation.

When the USAMEOS program was first developed, the training program was divided into Basic and Advanced Courses. The basic course work was 20 weeks long. The advanced course work was 32 weeks long. The courses were later changed to a 40-week basic class (35G) and 32-week advanced course (35U). The graduates of the basic course were known as "Super G's" referring to the MOS of 35G. With a small amount of additional course work, USAMEOS graduates could earn an AAS in Biomedical Equipment Maintenance from Regis University in Denver.
During the 1990s, the MOS designation was changed to 91A for Biomedical Equipment Repair Technician, and the Basic Course consisted of a 38-week course broken up into twelve modules. Didactic Modules included Anatomy and Physiology, Basic Soldering, AC/DC theory and Ohm's Law, electron theory, Transistor Theory, Digital Circuits, Basic Troubleshooting, Dental and Pneumatic Devices, heating and cooling, Sterilizers and Ultrasonic Cleaners, Linear Circuits, Spectrophotometers and Solid State Relays, advanced troubleshooting, cryogenics primer, high and low capacity modules of X-ray,  The school culminated in a field problem where students lived in ISOs and temper tents while filling out paperwork in the field environment to include pulling guard duty and setup of mobile sterile operating units and generators.. After graduation from the basic course, students would typically be assigned to an operational unit for practical work between the Basic and Advanced Courses. Technical training at USAMEOS was accelerated, 8 hours per day in class, it was intensive and provided both engineering theory and hands on learning opportunities in an extensive set of labs. The school closed in 1999 due to base closure.

Fitzsimons was a training center for phase II of the ARMY  practical nurse (91C) from —- to the last class graduating 22 March 1996.

Notable people

James E. Bowman was Chief of Pathology here during the 1950s.
Dwight D. Eisenhower was hospitalized here for several weeks in 1955 due to a heart attack.
John Kerry was born here on December 11, 1943, while his father was receiving treatment for tuberculosis.
Donato LaRossa served as Assistant Chief of Plastic and Reconstructive Surgery here in the mid-1970s.

See also
 List of former United States Army medical units

References

External links 
 Defense Environmental Restoration Program: Fitzsimons Army Medical Center
 
   U.S. House of Representatives hearings on conversion of the site

Buildings and structures in Aurora, Colorado
Military hospitals in the United States
Military in Aurora, Colorado
Military installations in Colorado
Defunct hospitals in Colorado
Closed medical facilities of the United States Army
Hospital buildings completed in 1918
Hospital buildings completed in 1941
Hospitals established in 1918
Skyscrapers in Colorado
1918 establishments in Colorado
1999 disestablishments in Colorado